Brunellia comocladifolia, commonly known as the West Indian sumac, is a species of tree in the family Brunelliaceae. It is native to Central America, the West Indies, and northern South America.

Description
The leaves and young shoots are clad in rusty coloured hairs and the foliage often has a reddish tinge. They are in opposite pairs, with five to eleven pairs of elliptical to oblong leaflets and a terminal leaflet. The underside of the leaflets are clad in short, velvety hairs. Male and female flowers are on separate trees. They are both very small and are borne in panicles clad in short hairs. The flowering period is April to August and the fruits appear from June to October.

Distribution and habitat
Brunellia comocladifolia is native to the West Indies, Central America and the extreme north of South America. Its range includes the countries of Colombia, Costa Rica, Cuba, Hispaniola (in both the Dominican Republic and Haiti), Ecuador, Guadeloupe, Jamaica, Puerto Rico and Venezuela. Along with Weinmannia pinnata, Prestoea montana, and Podocarpus coriaceus, it is present in the wet cloud forest in the Sierra de Luquillo mountains in Puerto Rico. Brunellia comocladifolia also occurs in the Hispaniolan moist forests of the Dominican Republic and Haiti.

References

acostae
Flora of Costa Rica
Flora of the Caribbean
Flora of Colombia
Flora of Ecuador
Flora of Venezuela
Plants described in 2017